Patrick H. Joyce (March 6, 1879 – November 10, 1946) was an American railroad executive.  He acted as chairman, president and trustee of the Chicago Great Western Railway between 1931 and 1946.

Notes
  Chicago Daily Tribune November 11, 1946.

1879 births
1946 deaths
20th-century American railroad executives
Chicago Great Western Railway presidents
Businesspeople from Chicago